The Stokkviknakken Tunnel is a road tunnel that is part of Norwegian County Road 830 in the municipality of Fauske in Nordland county, Norway. It is located between Finneid in the town of Fauske and the village of Sulitjelma.

The tunnel was built to shorten the overall length of the railroad by straightening the path and going through a mountain rather than curving around it. The railway line was closed and dismantled in 1972. The tunnel was rebuilt soon after when the old railway line was converted into a highway which opened in 1975.

See also
Grønnlifjell Tunnel
Hårskolten Tunnel
Sjønståfjell Tunnel

References

Fauske
Road tunnels in Nordland
Railway tunnels in Nordland
1962 establishments in Norway
Tunnels completed in 1962
Tunnels on the Sulitjelma Line
Roads within the Arctic Circle

no:Hårskoltentunnelen